Koushik Kar is an Indian Bengali actor, theatre director. He started his professional acting in the year 2010 as a Minerva Repertory Theatre actor, in kolkata. His first performance was in the play Raja Lear (2010) in which the celebrated Bengali actor Soumitra Chatterjee was in the lead. His work Ma Ak Nirbhik Sainik (2013) as a director and actor was officially selected in 17th Bharat Rang Mahotsav, 2015. His direction and acting in various plays over the years rendered him as a well known theatre personality in contemporary Bengali theatre community and audiences.

He made his acting debut in the Bengali feature film Lorai: Play to Live (2012). Among other appearances his latest one was in the Bengali horror flick Shob Bhooturey (2017) directed by Birsa Dasgupta.

In March 2021, after joining the Bharatiya Janata Party, Kar was removed from the cast of a play about the 2015 Dadri lynching.

Theatre
After starting his career as a Minerva repertory actor with the play Raja Lear in 2010, he subsequently acted in Devi Sarpamasta (2012) by Debesh Chattopadhyay , Chandragupta (2012) by Koushik Chattopadhya under Minerva Repertory. In Chandragupta  he played the title role and his acting, dynamic agility, bodily presence was applauded. A sword fight scene in this play between Raja Nanda played by Anirban Bhattacharya and Chandragupta played by him was much talked and was also praised by famous writer Sunil Gangopadhyay in an article. His next notable work was Ras (2013) based on the novel of Narendranath Mitra by the same name directed by Sangita Pal. He got Sayak Samman - 2015 in the best actor category for his acting in this play. Some other important mention of him as an actor till now is -Boma (2015) directed by Bratya Basu, Indur o Manush (2016) by Debasis Biswas, Raja Oedipus (2016) by Rajesh Debnath etc.

In 2013 he got into direction with the play Ma Ak Nirbhik Sainik based on the novel of Sailen Ghosh by the same name under Howrah Jonaki production. In 2014 he founded his own theatre group Kolkata Rangeela and started to stage the play Ma Ak Nirbhik Sainik under his own Kolkata Rangeela production . The play  got selected in the 17th Bharat Rang Mahotsav 2015 and also brought him Sundaram Samman 2015 in the best director category. Since  then he directed three plays under his own  Kolkata rangeela banner Natok Fatok (2015), Pornomochi (2015), Auto (2017), and one under Purbo Paschim production Hasuli Banker Upakatha (2015).

List of Plays

Filmography
In 2012 in his debut movie Lorai: Play to Live, directed by Parambrata Chatterjee he played one important role of Chipla Mahato and was appreciated in print media. Next he acted in two Bengali films under Zee Bangla Cinema Originals Kader Kuler Bou (2015) opposite Koneenica Banerjee and Barood(2015) as an antagonist. His other notable work was in Shob Bhooturey(2017) by Birsa Dasgupta.

In 2017  he took his first venture as a writer director in a Bengali film Pornomochi. A play by the same name was staged by him back in 2015. The film released in April, 2018.

List of  Movies

Chabiwala 2019

Akash ongsoto meghla 2022

Mahishashur Marddini 2022

TV and web series
Mahanayak (TV series), 2016.
Swtyaneshi Pather Kanta – Byomkesh Web Series (Season 1 episode 1 as Prafulla Ray) in Hoichoi Originals.

Awards

References

External Reference
 
 

Indian male film actors
Living people
People from Baharampur
Male actors from West Bengal
Indian male stage actors
University of Kalyani alumni
1984 births